Reza Ayyar is an Iranian football midfielder who currently plays for Iranian football club Baadraan Tehran in the Iran Pro League.

Club career
Ayyar joined Esteghlal Ahvaz in summer 2015, after graduating from Foolad Academy. He made his professional debut for Esteghlal Ahvaz on November 30, 2015 against Foolad where he used as a substitute for Adel Kolahkaj.

Club career statistics

References

External links
 Reza Ayyar at IranLeague.ir

1994 births
Living people
Iranian footballers
Esteghlal Ahvaz players
Association football midfielders